The following is a list of centenarians – specifically, people who became famous as religious figures – known for reasons other than their longevity''. For more lists, see lists of centenarians.

References

Religious figures